The SPCA 80 was a French transport monoplane designed by Société Provençale de Constructions Aéronautiques (SPCA) to meet a French government requirement for a single-engined colonial transport, specifically for police duties.

Design
The SPCA 80 was a single-engined high-wing cantilever monoplane with a fixed tailskid landing gear. It had a cockpit for a crew of two and a cabin for four passengers. It was powered by a nose-mounted Gnome-Rhône 7Kb radial engine. Only a single example was built, registration F-AKFH.

The SPCA 80 was followed by a single example of a version powered by a Lorraine 9Na engine, designated the SPCA 81, which first flew on 25 April the same year. The SPCA 81 was later fitted with a Renault 9Ca engine, at which point it was designated the SPCA 82.

Variants
 SPCA 80 — initial version with Gnome-Rhône 7Kb engine (1 built)
 SPCA 81 — version with Lorraine 9Na engine (1 built)
 SPCA 82 — version with Renault 9Ca engine (1 converted from SPCA 81)

Specifications

References

Notes

Bibliography

 
 

1930s French civil utility aircraft
SPCA aircraft
High-wing aircraft
Single-engined tractor aircraft
Aircraft first flown in 1932